Howsham railway station was a station in Howsham, Lincolnshire on the line between Grimsby and Lincoln, England.  The station opened in 1848 closed on 1 November 1965 as were many neighbouring stations, however the line it stood on remains open.

References

Disused railway stations in the Borough of North Lincolnshire
Railway stations in Great Britain opened in 1848
Railway stations in Great Britain closed in 1965
Former Great Central Railway stations